The Aon Center is the name of two buildings.

 Aon Center (Chicago)
 Aon Center (Los Angeles)